The Coast Cricket Association is the affiliate of Cricket Kenya responsible from cricket activities in the several counties formerly part of Coast Province in Kenya. It runs the Coast Cricket Association Leagues through which, together with those of the Rift Valley Cricket Association and Nairobi Province Cricket Association used to be the basis of selecting the Kenya national cricket team. The Association had previously fielded a representative of it. A Coast Cricket Association XI first appeared as a representative side in 1957 against Sunder Cricket Club, and it later played a first-class match in 1964 against Pakistan International Airlines at Mombasa Sports Club, with their only appearance in first-class cricket ending in an innings and 82 run defeat, with the Coast Cricket Association XI making 125 and 105 in its two innings. Since then the team has occasionally played minor matches, the last of which came in 2007 when it played Denmark. It is also responsible for the Coast Pekee franchise in the East Africa Premier League and Cup competitions.

Coast Cricket Association XI v Pakistan International Airlines

References

External links
Coast Cricket Association
Coast Cricket Association XI at CricketArchive

Cricket administration in Kenya
Cricket teams in Kenya
Former senior cricket clubs in Kenya